Momoko Sayama (born 19 February 1992) is a Japanese professional footballer who plays as a defender for WE League club Sanfrecce Hiroshima Regina.

Club career
Sayama made her WE League debut on 18 September 2021.

References 

Living people
1992 births
Women's association football defenders
WE League players
Japanese women's footballers
Association football people from Hiroshima Prefecture
Sanfrecce Hiroshima Regina players